Yilmaz Kerimo (born 1963) is a Swedish-Assyrian and a member of the Riksdag (the Swedish Parliament) and a member of the Swedish Social Democratic Party. He was first elected in the Swedish parliament in 1998 and was re-elected in 2006.

References

1963 births
Living people
Members of the Riksdag from the Social Democrats
Swedish people of Assyrian/Syriac descent
Turkish people of Assyrian descent
Syriac Orthodox Christians
Members of the Riksdag 2002–2006